Richard George Ottele (December 8, 1926 – September 20, 1985) was an American football player who played at the blocking back and defensive back positions. He played college football for Washington and professional football for the Los Angeles Dons.

Early years
Ottele was born in 1926 in Yuma, Colorado. He attended and played football at Woodrow Wilson Classical High School in Long Beach, California.

Military and college football
He played college football for Washington in 1944, 1945, and 1947. He also served in the United States Navy.

Professional football
He was selected by the New York Giants in the ninth round (66th overall pick) of the 1948 NFL Draft and by the New York Yankees in the 13th round (80th overall pick) of the 1948 AAFC Draft. 

He was the subject of controversy when it was disclosed prior to his senior season at Washington that he had secretly signed a contract to play professional football for the New York Yankees of the All-America Football Conference. The Yankees sold him to the Los Angeles Dons in May 1948.

He played in the All-America Football Conference (AAFC) for the Los Angeles Dons during their 1948 season, appearing in nine games. In June 1949, the Dons sold Ottele to the Chicago Hornets.

Later years
He died in 1985 in Bremerton, Washington at age 58.

References

1926 births
1985 deaths
Los Angeles Dons players
Players of American football from Colorado
Washington Huskies football players
United States Navy personnel of World War II